When waves travel into areas of shallow water, they begin to be affected by the ocean bottom.  The free orbital motion of the water is disrupted, and water particles in orbital motion no longer return to their original position.  As the water becomes shallower, the swell becomes higher and steeper, ultimately assuming the familiar sharp-crested wave shape.  After the wave breaks, it becomes a wave of translation and erosion of the ocean bottom intensifies.

Cnoidal waves are exact periodic solutions to the Korteweg–de Vries equation in shallow water, that is, when the wavelength of the wave is much greater than the depth of the water.

See also

External links
 Exploring the World Ocean
 The Oceans

Water waves